Aramu or Armu may refer to:
 Aramu, Ilam
 Armu, Mazandaran
 Aramu Rural District, in Ilam Province